"Wrong" is a song written and recorded by English musical duo Everything but the Girl. It was released on 17 June 1996 as the second single from their ninth album, Walking Wounded (1996). A club remix of the song provided by Todd Terry went to number-one on the US Billboard Hot Dance Club Play chart. The remix also reached number two in Italy and number eight in Canada and the United Kingdom.

Critical reception
Larry Flick from Billboard wrote, "Singer Tracey Thorn thrills with a vocal that is a study in '30s-era torch melodrama but couched with just enough pop restraint to remain accessible to pop radio's young listeners. Although Todd Terry is once again at the remix helm, "Wrong" is not a mere exercise in duplication. This time, the keyboards are richer and the beats more insistent and African-influenced. The real duplication should be radio's quick acceptance of this pop/dance jewel." Daina Darzin from Cash Box described it as "ethereal" and "undulating". Daisy & Havoc from Music Weeks Dance Update rated it five out of five, picking it as Tune of the Week. They added, "Everything But The Girl's latest is creepily reminiscent of Fleetwood Mac but that's no criticism, and maybe some new mixes of tracks from Rumours aren't such a bad idea. Or maybe they are...anyway here you get Todd Terry, Deep Dish and EBTG mixes of a very lovely, very 'Missing'-type song...and that's no criticism either."

Track listingsUK and Australian CD single "Wrong" (Todd Terry remix edit) – 3:55
 "Wrong" (Todd Terry remix) – 6:40
 "Wrong" (Deep Dish remix) – 12:01
 "Wrong" (Mood II Swing dub) – 8:52
 "Wrong" (EBTG original mix) – 4:35UK 12-inch singleA1. "Wrong" (Todd Terry remix) – 6:40
A2. "Wrong" (Deep Dish remix) – 12:01
B1. "Wrong" (Mood II Swing dub) – 8:52
B2. "Wrong" (Deep Dish dub) – 11:52UK cassette single and European CD single "Wrong" (Todd Terry remix edit) – 3:55
 "Wrong" (Deep Dish remix edit) – 4:03US 12-inch singleA1. "Wrong" (Todd Terry remix) – 6:48
A2. "Wrong" (EBTG original mix) – 4:36
B1. "Wrong" (Deep Dish remix) – 11:30US maxi-CD single "Wrong" (EBTG original mix) – 4:36
 "Wrong" (Todd Terry remix edit) – 3:55
 "Wrong" (Deep Dish remix edit) – 4:20
 "Wrong" (Todd Terry remix) – 6:48
 "Wrong" (Everything but the Drums) – 4:25
 "Wrong" (Tee's Beats) – 2:25
 "Wrong" (Deep Dish remix) – 11:30
 "Wrong" (Deep Dish dub) – 11:43US cassette single'
A1. "Wrong" (EBTG original mix edit) – 3:55
A2. "Wrong" (Todd Terry remix edit) – 3:55
B1. "Wrong" (EBTG original mix edit) – 3:55
B2. "Wrong" (Deep Dish remix edit) – 4:20

Charts

Weekly charts

Year-end charts

Release history

See also
 List of number-one dance singles of 1996 (U.S.)

References

1996 singles
1996 songs
2001 singles
Atlantic Records singles
Virgin Records singles
Everything but the Girl songs
Songs written by Ben Watt
Songs written by Tracey Thorn